Tobias Stirl (born 17 April 2000) is a German footballer who plays as a goalkeeper for the American team Winsonsin Badgers representing the University of Wisconsin–Madison.

Career
Stirl made his professional debut for TSV Havelse in the 3. Liga on 2 April 2022 against Eintracht Braunschweig.

References

External links
 
 
 
 

2000 births
Living people
Footballers from Frankfurt
German footballers
Association football goalkeepers
Eintracht Frankfurt players
VfL Wolfsburg II players
TSV Havelse players
Wisconsin Badgers men's soccer players
3. Liga players
Regionalliga players
German expatriate footballers
Expatriate soccer players in the United States
German expatriate sportspeople in the United States